Appenzell Castle is a castle in the Appenzell District of the canton of Appenzell Innerrhoden in Switzerland. It is one of a few 16th century stone buildings in Appenzell. It is part of the Swiss heritage site of national significance.

History
The castle was built in 1563 as an elegant mansion the doctor Antoni Löw. Antoni was an enthusiastic supporter of the Protestant Reformation in Appenzell. In 1584 he was captured, judged and sentenced to death by the local Catholics for slandering a priest. After his death the castle was taken by the city and given to the Franciscans. They remained in the castle for almost a century, until 1682 when they moved into the newly completed St. Mary of the Angels. When the Franciscans moved out, the castle was sold to Antoni Speck who owned it until his death in 1708. It then passed to Johann Baptist Fortunat and then into the possession of the Sutter family. On 15 February 1875 Doctor Anton Alfred Sutter became the sole owner of the castle. He established his practice in the castle, leading to it being known as the "Doctor's House". Today the castle remains the property of the Sutter family.

See also
List of castles and fortresses in Switzerland

References

External links

Appenzell Innerrhoden
Appenzell (village)
Abbey of Saint Gall
Ruined castles in Switzerland
Cultural property of national significance in Appenzell Innerrhoden